This is an, as yet, incomplete summary of the year 2005 in the Irish music industry.

Summary

January 
 On 4 January Ian Brown was confirmed for Oxegen 2005.

February 
 On 8 February The Killers were confirmed for Oxegen 2005.
 On 10 February Keane were confirmed for Oxegen 2005.
 At the 2005 Grammy Awards in Los Angeles on 13 February, U2's critically acclaimed international hit single "Vertigo" won three awards: "Best Rock Song", "Best Rock Performance by a Duo or Group with Vocal" and "Best Short Form Music Video".
 On 14 February The Frames were confirmed for Oxegen 2005.

March 
 On 3 March Green Day were confirmed as Saturday night headliners of Oxegen 2005.
 On 4 March wickets for Oxegen 2005 went on sale as an appearance by Queens of the Stone Age was officially confirmed for the festival.

June 
 On 11 June Neil Diamond played a sold-out show at Lansdowne Road.
 On 22 June Coldplay played to a crowd of 20,000 at Marlay Park in Dublin. They were supported by Morning Runner and Interpol.
 2005 saw U2 bringing their Vertigo Tour to Croke Park in Dublin for three dates in the summer (24, 25 and 27 June) following the release of the band's long-awaited eleventh studio album, How to Dismantle an Atomic Bomb the previous year. U2 broke Irish box office marks with ticket sales for these Croke Park concerts, after more than 240,000 tickets were sold in record time.

July 
 July marked the 20th anniversary of Live Aid, an event which Bob Geldof had played a significant role in organising. In an attempt to highlight the growing need to cancel Third World debt, Geldof, Bono, Elton John and many others in the music industry campaigned for justice in the build-up to the G8 Conference and Summit in Scotland, leading to the organisation of Live 8 on 2 July. The event, which was only announced by Geldof on 30 May was on a much larger scale than Live Aid, with 10 simultaneous concerts in 9 different countries broadcast live around the world. However, unlike its predecessor, its main aim was to highlight inequalities as opposed to raising money. U2 opened the Hyde Park concert with their rendition of "Sgt. Pepper's Lonely Hearts Club Band" alongside Paul McCartney. Snow Patrol performed later.
 Oasis played a sold-out show in Marlay Park, Dublin on Saturday 16 or Sunday 17 July .

August 
 Bud Rising came to Ireland for the first time in August 2005. The Chemical Brothers and Sonic Youth, supported by Mainline, played Marlay Park on 19 August, whilst Basement Jaxx, Underworld and Mylo played the same venue the following day. Pixies and Kings of Leon played Lansdowne Road on 23 August, whilst Scissor Sisters, Franz Ferdinand  and Maroon 5 played the same venue the following day.
 Arcade Fire were the surprise act at the newly expanded two-day Electric Picnic.

Bands formed 
 Delorentos
 Director
 Envelope
 Ham Sandwich
 Humanzi
 The Kinetiks (Late 2005)
 Red Organ Serpent Sound
 The Spikes
 Super Extra Bonus Party

Bands disbanded 
 Rubyhorse

Bands reformed 
 Kerbdog
 The Sultans of Ping FC
 Whipping Boy

Albums & EPs 
Below is a list of notable albums & EPs released by Irish artists in Ireland in 2005.

 New Dawn Breaking – The Walls (June 2005)
 Check In – The Chalets (2 September 2005)
 Leave It On – Delorentos (October 2005) – EP 
 Triega – Triega (11 March 2005) – (EP)
 Turn LP – Turn (23 September 2005) – (EP)
 Flock – Bell X1 (14 October 2005) Bell X1 - Flock
 The World Should Know – Dave Couse/Couse and the Impossible (31 October 2005)
 The Roads Don't Love You – Gemma Hayes (31 October 2005)
 Rubicon – The Duggans & Friends

Singles 
Below is a list of notable singles released by Irish artists in Ireland in 2005.

Date unknown
 "Happy Sad" – Gemma Hayes (??? 2005)
 "All Is Violent, All Is Bright" – God Is an Astronaut (??? 2005)
 "Feel the Machine" – The Chalets (??? 2005)
 "No Style" – The Chalets (??? 2005)
 "The Irish Keep Gate-crashing" – The Thrills (??? 2005)

Festivals

Oxegen 2005 
 Oxegen 2005 took place at Punchestown Racecourse in County Kildare on Saturday 9 and Sunday 10 July. It was headlined by Green Day, Foo Fighters, New Order, James Brown, The Prodigy, Queens of the Stone Age and The Frames.

Electric Picnic 2006 
 Electric Picnic 2005 took place in Stradbally Estate, County Laois. It was headlined by Kraftwerk, The Flaming Lips, Nick Cave and the Bad Seeds, The Human League, Röyksopp, Mercury Rev, Fatboy Slim and Arcade Fire.

Heineken Green Energy 
 Heineken Green Energy took place for the 10th year in 2005, featuring Beck and Paddy Casey.

Bud Rising 
 Bud Rising Summer Shows took place in Ireland for the first time in 2005. The gigs took place over four days in two different venues; Marlay Park and Lansdowne Road. Chemical Brothers played Marlay Park on 19 August, whilst Basement Jaxx, Underworld and Mylo played the same venue the following day. Pixies and Kings of Leon played Lansdowne Road on 23 August, whilst Scissor Sisters, Franz Ferdinand  and Maroon 5 played the same venue the following day.

Live at the Marquee 
 Live at the Marquee 2005 took place in the Cork Showgrounds between 30 June and 17 July. Headlining acts included Brian Wilson, Aslan, Diana Ross, Al Green, Nick Cave, Tommy Tiernan, Damien Dempsey and Christy Moore.

Slane 2006 
 Slane 2005 was cancelled following the failure of headline act Eminem to co-operate with the organisers. His support act was due to have been 50 Cent.

Music awards

2005 Meteor Awards 
The 2005 Meteor Awards were held on ???, 2005. Below are the winners:

Choice Music Prize 
The Choice Music Prize did not exist this year.

See also
2005 in Swiss music

References

External links 
 IMRO website
 IRMA website
 Hot Press website
 State website
 MUSE.ie
 CLUAS.com
 News at Phantom FM
 Music at The Irish Times
 Music at the Irish Independent
 Music news and album reviews at RTÉ